John Kidney (born 30 June 1871) was an Irish hurler who played as a left half-back for the Cork senior team.

Kidney made his first appearance for the team during the 1891 championship and was a regular member of the starting seventeen until his retirement after the 1897 championship. During that time he won one All-Ireland medal and one Munster medal.

At club level Kidney won multiple county club championship medalist with Blackrock.

His brother, Dinny Kidney, was also an All-Ireland medalist with Cork.

References

1871 births
Year of death missing
Blackrock National Hurling Club hurlers
Cork inter-county hurlers
All-Ireland Senior Hurling Championship winners